Vladislav Kara (born 20 April 1998) is a Russian professional ice hockey player who is currently playing for HC Vityaz in the Kontinental Hockey League (KHL). He was selected by the Toronto Maple Leafs in the fourth round, 124th overall, in the 2017 NHL Entry Draft.

Playing career
Kara played as a youth and later made his professional debut with Ak Bars Kazan in the 2017–18 season. Following his third KHL season within Ak Bars, unable to cement a full-time role on the roster, Kara was traded to fellow KHL club Severstal Cherepovets in exchange for financial compensation on 17 July 2020.

In the following 2020–21 season, Kara made 17 appearances with Severstal, posting 1 goal and 3 points. He was also assigned to VHL farm club, Molot-Prikamye Perm, collecting 4 points through 14 games. On 27 December 2020, Kara brief tenure with Severstal ended as he was mutually released from his contract to sign a two-way contract with HC Spartak Moscow for the remainder of the season.

Following a full season in the VHL with HC Yugra, Kara returned to the KHL for the 2022–23 season in securing a contract with former club, Severstal Cherepovets, on 5 May 2022. Before re-joining Severstal, Kara was again on the move after he was traded to HC Vityaz in exchange for financial compensation on 13 July 2022.

Career statistics

References

External links

1998 births
Living people
Russian ice hockey players
Ak Bars Kazan players
Bars Kazan players
Molot-Prikamye Perm players
Severstal Cherepovets players
HC Spartak Moscow players
Toronto Maple Leafs draft picks
HC Vityaz players
HC Yugra players